Clanga may refer to:
Clanga (bird), the spotted eagle genus in the family Accipitridae
8979 Clanga, a main-belt asteroid